Badi Didi is a 1969 Hindi-language drama film, produced by Narendra Suri and Nand Kumar under the Archana Films banner and directed by Narendra Suri. Starring Jeetendra, Nanda  and music composed by Ravi.

Plot
Post Master Keshav Prasad well-respected lives with his daughter Bhavana. Despite this, agonized he embraces his elder brother's orphan children Anil & Anita. On a trip, Bhavana is acquainted with Lieutenant Amar Varma and has a crush. However, destiny detaches them, and their whereabouts are not known. In tandem, Keshav Prasad fixes an alliance for Anita but is perturbed to accumulate the dowry when his mate Dayal a postman comforts him. Besides, Prof. Dindayal Varma an altruistic, principal of Bhavana is inspired by her nobility and aspires to knit her with his son. Here, Keshav Prasad is gratified and approves it. Now Bhavana has to forcibly face the bridegroom she becomes jubilant to see Amar and things go well. One night a woman in trouble knocks on the door of Keshav Prasad, to withdraw money from the post office. Out of humanitarian, he violates the rules and is sentenced. Then, Bhavana faces several hardships but with the support of Amar, she succeeds in wedlock Anita and graduates with Anil. The next, the Indian army declares an emergency, so, Amar pauses the wedding and leaves for the battlefield. During that time, Anil marries his love interest Aarti one that humiliates Bhavana. Moreover, hearing the death news of Amar she is devastated. After some time, Dindayal forcibly makes Bhavana agree to a match. Here as serendipity, Amar returns alive and Keshav Prasad is acquitted. At last, Anil & Aarti also plead pardon. Finally, the movie ends on a happy note with the marriage of Amar & Bhavana.

Cast
Jeetendra as Lieutenant Amar Verma
Nanda as Bhavna Prasad
Mehmood as Madan
Om Prakash as Dayal
Jeevan as Lala
Aruna Irani as Anita
Padma Khanna as Aarti
Leela Chitnis as Mother  
Nazir Hussain as Keshav Prasad
Ulhas as Dindayal Verma
Raj Mehra
Polson 
Tun Tun
Purnima

Soundtrack

References

External links
 

1960s Hindi-language films
Films scored by Ravi